The President's Cup (also known as Astana Challenger) is a tennis tournament played on outdoor hardcourts. It is currently part of the ATP Challenger Tour and the ITF Women's Circuit and has been held annually in Nur-Sultan, Kazakhstan, since 2007.

Past finals

Men's singles

Men's doubles

Women's singles

Women's doubles

External links
 Official website

 
ATP Challenger Tour
ITF Women's World Tennis Tour
Hard court tennis tournaments
Recurring sporting events established in 2007
Sport in Astana
Tennis tournaments in Kazakhstan
Summer events in Kazakhstan